When We Were Bullies is a 2021 short documentary film written, directed, produced, and edited by Jay Rosenblatt.

Summary
The director tries to track down his 5th-grade teacher and remembers a bullying incident that he was part of from 50 years ago (despite not interviewing the victim of said incident) alongside remembering his younger brother's death from 
colitis surgery.

Release and reception
It premiered at the 2021 Sundance Film Festival. before airing on HBO March 30.

The Washington Post called it "a deeply personal essay".

Accolades
94th Academy Awards: Academy Award for Best Documentary (Short Subject) – nomination

References

External links
Official website
When We Were Bulies on IMDb
WNYC interview
Official trailer
Excerpt

2021 short documentary films
Films about bullying
German short documentary films
American short documentary films
Collage film
Films directed by Jay Rosenblatt
2020s English-language films
2020s American films